Unni Straume (born 2 October 1955) is a Norwegian film director and screenwriter. Her film Drømspel was screened in the Un Certain Regard section at the 1994 Cannes Film Festival.

Filmography

Director 
 Kystkunst (1977)
 Trubadur (1978). Documentary about the Norwegian musician Jan Eggum.
 Kap Farvel (1981). Documentary about shrimps fishing in  the Barent's sea.
 Hot House (1982). Documentary about jazz in Oslo.
 Bilete frå ei øy (1983)
 Roma Con Amore (1984)
 Way North. Fem norske kunstnere (1986)
 Pjuska (1988). Documentary about a cat.
 Til en ukjent (1990). Autobiographic, in black and white.
 Avsporing (1993). Shortmovie, presented in Cannes Film Festival.
 Drømspel (1994). Presented at  Cannes Film Festival for Un Certain Regard
 T83 (1995). 13 min, about a travel to Orte, Italy.
 Thranes metode (1998). From Thranes metode og andre noveller by Øystein Lønn.
 Pappasøndag (1999). shortmovie directed in Italia.
 Musikk for bryllup og begravelser (2002). Nominated for Nordisk Råds filmpris (2002). Soundtrack by Goran Bregović. Presented at the Venice Film Festival.
 REMAKE.me (2014). Autobiographic movie with cuts from other of her own movies and scenes filmed in: Fiksdal, Terracina, Oslo and Rome.

References

External links

1955 births
Living people
Norwegian film directors
Norwegian women film directors
Norwegian screenwriters
Norwegian women screenwriters